Monopeltis anchietae, also known commonly as Anchieta's worm lizard, Anchieta's spade-snouted worm lizard, and the Angolan spade-snouted worm lizard, is a species of amphisbaenian in the family Amphisbaenidae. The species is native to southern Africa.

Etymology
The specific name, anchietae, is in honor of Portuguese naturalist José Alberto de Oliveira Anchieta, who was an explorer of Africa.

Geographic range
M. anchietae is found in Angola, Botswana, Namibia (including the Caprivi Strip), and Zambia.

Habitat

Description
M. anchietae is reddish brown dorsally, and unpigmented ventrally. The head shields are yellowish tan.

Reproduction
M. anchietae is viviparous.

References

Further reading
Auerbach RD (1987). The Amphibians and Reptiles of Botswana. Gaborone, Botswana: Mokwepa Consultants. 295 pp. . (Monopeltis anchietae, p. 139).
Bocage JVB (1873). "Reptiles nouveaux de l'intérieur de Mossamedes ". Jornal de Sciências Mathemáticas Physicas e Naturaes da Academia Real das Sciencias de Lisboa 4: 247–253. ("Lepidosternon (Phractogonus) Anchietae", new species, pp. 247–248, Figures 1–4). (in French).
Boulenger GA (1885). Catalogue of the Lizards in the British Museum (Natural History). Second Edition. Volume II. ... Amphisbænidæ. London: Trustees of the British Museum (Natural History). (Taylor and Francis, printers). xiii + 497 pp. + Plates I–XXIV. (Monopeltis anchietae, pp. 458–459).
Gans C (2005). "Checklist and Bibliography of the Amphisbaenia of the World". Bulletin of the American Museum of Natural History (289): 1–130. (Monopeltis anchietae, p. 34).

Monopeltis
Reptiles of Angola
Reptiles of Botswana
Reptiles of Namibia
Reptiles of Zambia
Reptiles described in 1873
Taxa named by José Vicente Barbosa du Bocage